The European Society for Paediatric Infectious Diseases (ESPID) is a non-profit medical association registered in Germany that focuses on paediatric infectious diseases. Since its founding in 1983, it has grown to include over 1300 members, from all over Europe and beyond. ESPID forms the basis for European clinicians and scientists interested in all aspects of infectious diseases in children and their prevention. The society is engaged in a number of activities including the organization of multicentre trials, international exchange of paediatric infectious disease fellows, educational activities, and an annual scientific conference.

Mission 

ESPID promotes "excellence in paediatric infectious diseases."

Activities 

ESPID offers several grants and fellowships  to facilitate information exchange, education, and research in the field of paediatric infectious diseases. The exact scope of each of these awards varies. The Small Grant Award and the Young Investigator Award fund individual research projects. The former focuses on projects designed to acquire preliminary data while the latter funds researchers under 40 years of age. ESPID also supports research through its Collaborative Research Meeting Scheme, which funds projects conducted by members of more than one European nation. ESPID funds two sets of fellowships. The Training Fellowships allow members to study in a different medical center or country. The ESPID Fellowships Awards provide funding for basic or clinical research.

More recently further awards have been introduced to its members and the full list of awards available are:
Fellowship Award	
General Travel Award	
Postgraduate Teaching Visits to Resource Poor Countries	
Small Grant Award	
Training Course and Workshop Award
Clinical Training Fellowship	
Young Investigator Award	
Collaborative Research Meeting Award	
ESPID Annual Meeting Travel Award	
Research Training Fellowship	
ESPID/INOPSU Infection Surveillance Research Grant	
ESPID-PIDJ Award 	
ESPID Supported Speaker Award

The criteria for each award is reviewed regularly and further updated information can be found at www.espid.org/awards.aspx?Group=awards

The association also supports projects designed to educate medical professionals. It funds training sessions for clinical trainees and continuing medical education for qualified physicians with its Training Course and Workshop Award. Additionally, the ESPID Postgraduate Teaching Visits to Resource Poor Countries encourages members to teach pediatric infectious disease techniques in countries with low or lower-middle income.

The ESPID Annual Meeting, held every year since 1983, consists of various workshops, lectures, and symposia to help healthcare professionals learn the latest scientific information about the diagnosis, treatment, and prevention of pediatric infectious diseases. The meeting is organized jointly with the ESPID Foundation. ESPID also hosts regional training sessions and educational workshops in various European countries. Travel awards are available to allow members to travel both to the Annual Meeting and to relevant scientific congresses in general. Lectures and presentations are often recorded by ESPID for use as webcasts on the association's website. The site currently has over 30 presentations available for members.

Publications 

The Pediatric Infectious Disease Journal is the official journal of ESPID. The Pediatric Infectious Disease Journal is published monthly and offers original studies and case reports, peer reviews of articles, different perspectives on pediatric practices, and updated information on drugs, treatments, and diseases. It is published by Lippincott Williams & Wilkins

Governance 

The current ESPID Board consists of the following members:

 
President: Delane Shingadia, Term of office 2019 - 2022
 
Secretary: Oana Falup-Pecurariu, Term of office 2019 - 2022
 
Treasurer: Johannes Truck, Term of office 2017 - 2020
 
Board member: Nigel Curtis, Term of office 2016 - 2020
 
Board Member: Vana Papaevangelou, Term of office: 2019 - 2022
 
Board Member: Hermione Lyall, Term of office 2018 - 2021
 
Young ESPID representative: Robin Marlow,Term of office 2017 - 2020

Young ESPID representative: Fani Ladomenou, Term of office 2018 - 2021

See also 
 European Society of Clinical Microbiology and Infectious Diseases
 Pediatrics
 Infectious disease

References

External links 
 ESPID Website
 Pediatric Infectious Diseases Conference - ESPID 2015
 Pediatric Infectious Diseases Conference - ESPID 2016
 Pediatric Infectious Diseases Conference - ESPID 2017
 Pediatric Infectious Diseases Conference - ESPID 2018
 Pediatric Infectious Diseases Conference - ESPID 2019
 The Pediatric Infectious Disease Journal

International medical associations of Europe
Organisations based in West Lothian
Microbiology organizations
Pediatric organizations